Tirabad in Iran may refer to:
 Tirabad, East Azerbaijan